North Central Oklahoma Cactus Botanical Garden is a botanical garden located at 308 West Main, Covington, Oklahoma. It includes over 1,500 types of rare and exotic cacti and succulents.

See also 
 List of botanical gardens and arboretums in the United States

External links
Information about the North Central Oklahoma Cactus Botanical Garden

Botanical gardens in Oklahoma
Protected areas of Garfield County, Oklahoma
Cactus gardens